This is a list of diseases starting with the letter "Q".

Q
 Q fever
 Qazi–Markouizos syndrome
 Quadrantanopia
 Quadriceps sparing myopathy
 Quadriceps tendon rupture
 Quadriparesis
 Quadriplegia
 Quebec platelet disorder
 Queensland tick typhus
 Quincke's edema
 Quinism
 Quinquaud's decalvans folliculitis
 Quinsy

Q